Rashad Sadiqov (born 8 October 1983) is an Azerbaijani footballer who plays as a central midfielder, for Keşla and the Azerbaijan national football team.

Career
Sadiqov signed a two-year contract with Khazar Lankaran in August 2014. After only six-months with Khazar, Sadiqov terminated his contract, going on to sign a six-month contract with Gabala FK with the option of another year.

In May 2017, Sadiqov left Gabala, signing a one-year contract with Zira FK.

Sadiqov was dismissed by Zira on 24 July 2017 for disciplinary reasons, rejoining Neftchi Baku on 11 September 2017.

Career statistics

Club

International

Statistics accurate as of match played 10 October 2015

Honours

International
Azerbaijan U23
 Islamic Solidarity Games: (1) 2017

References

External links

 Profile on official club website
 

1983 births
Living people
Azerbaijani footballers
Azerbaijan international footballers
Azerbaijan youth international footballers
Azerbaijan under-21 international footballers
Azerbaijani Shia Muslims
Qarabağ FK players
MOIK Baku players
Gabala FC players
Azerbaijan Premier League players
People from Nakhchivan
Association football midfielders
Neftçi PFK players